Zyon Cavalera (born January 19, 1993) is an American drummer, best known as the son of ex-Sepultura and current Soulfly frontman Max Cavalera and as the current drummer for Soulfly and Lody Kong.

Background

Zyon Cavalera was born on January 19, 1993. His father Max added his in utero heartbeat into the beginning of the 1993 Sepultura song "Refuse/Resist" from their album Chaos A.D.. Having grown up learning from the likes of uncle Igor Cavalera, ex-Soulfly drummer Roy Mayorga and Black Sabbath drummer Bill Ward, in 2010 he played drums on a cover of Refuse/Resist by Soulfly, as a bonus track for the band's seventh album Omen, and in 2012 he played drums on the track "Revengeance" on Enslaved along with brothers Richie and Igor.

In 2011, Cavalera formed the band Lody Kong, with his brother Igor Jr. fronting the band (the two are also involved in Mold Breaker, formed in 2010).  Lody Kong has toured worldwide in the "Maximum Cavalera Tour" with Soulfly and Incite, fronted by half brother Richie. During this tour towards the end of 2012, Soulfly parted ways with the retiring David Kinkade, with Cavalera replacing him. In February 2013, Lody Kong released their debut EP, No Rules, produced by Roy Mayorga with art by Sergio Zuniga. A music video was released on May 21, 2013 for "mOnkeys alWays Look." In 2013, it was confirmed that Cavalera would be performing in a full-time capacity on Soulfly's 9th album, Savages.

March 25, 2016, marks Lody Kong's first full length debut album, Dreams And Visions, distributed by Mascot Label Group and produced by John Gray (Soulfly, Cavalera Conspiracy) with Sergio Zuniga returning to create all the artwork for the album.

Discography

With Lody Kong 
Bird EP (2012)
No Rules EP (2013)
Dreams And Visions (2016)

With Soulfly 
Soulfly (1998) – voice on "Bumbklaatt"
Primitive (2000) – foosball sampler on "Mulambo"
3 (2002) – voices on "One Nation"
Omen (2010) – drums on "Refuse/Resist"
Enslaved (2012) – drums on "Revengeance"
Savages (2013) – drums, percussion
Archangel (2015) – drums, percussion
Ritual (2018) - drums, percussion
Totem (2022) - drums, percussion

With Sepultura 
Chaos A.D. (1993) – heartbeat on "Refuse/Resist"

References

1993 births
21st-century American drummers
American male drummers
American people of Brazilian descent
American heavy metal drummers
Living people
Musicians from Phoenix, Arizona
Soulfly members